This is an incomplete list of the highest settlements in each state or territory in the United States, as well as the District of Columbia. These settlements may be cities, towns, census-designated places or other unincorporated communities. Only settlements that are permanently occupied year-round are included.

In some cases, the elevation provided is the highest point within the limits of the settlement, while in others it is the average elevation or the elevation of the settlement's central point. As such, the different settlements listed may not be directly comparable. Some unincorporated communities, such as Lakewood, Florida, lack official boundaries; it is therefore subjective whether a specific high point can be said to be located within these settlements.

List

References

 Highest
Cities
Cities-related lists of superlatives